Sheryl F. Kelsey (born 1945) is an American biostatistician and epidemiologist who became the first woman to earn a doctorate in statistics from Carnegie Mellon University. She made significant contributions to how heart disease is treated by studying the outcomes of coronary angioplasty.

Education and career
Kelsey was born in Cleveland, Ohio in 1945, and grew up in New Jersey and Iowa.
She studied mathematics as an undergraduate, with a minor in chemistry, graduating in 1967 from Mount Holyoke College.
She earned her PhD from Carnegie Mellon in 1978, with a dissertation on the air pollution caused by steel mills, supervised by Paul Shaman. She joined the University of Pittsburgh, and remained there until her retirement in 2012.

Awards and honors
She is a fellow of the American Statistical Association, the American Heart Association, and the International Academy of Cardiovascular Sciences.
She also chairs the IAIA Foundation of the Institute of American Indian Arts.

References

1945 births
Living people
American women epidemiologists
American epidemiologists
American statisticians
Women statisticians
Mount Holyoke College alumni
Carnegie Mellon University alumni
University of Pittsburgh faculty
Fellows of the American Statistical Association